The 1991 Irish local elections were held in all counties and county boroughs on Thursday, 27 June 1991. They were postponed from June 1990 to allow the Local Government Act 1991 to be passed beforehand. Elections in non-county boroughs and towns were postponed until 1994.

Results

Summary

By local authority

Counties

County boroughs

References

Sources

Citations

See also 
Local government in the Republic of Ireland
:Category:Irish local government councils

 
1991
June 1991 events in Europe
Local